St Paul's Juniors (formerly Colet Court) is a private preparatory school for boys aged 7 to 13 in Barnes, London. It forms the preparatory department of St Paul's School, to which most Juniors pupils progress at the age of 13.

The School was founded in 1881, named Colet Court in 1892, and renamed St Paul's Juniors from 1 September 2016.

History

The School was founded in 1881 (as "Bewsher's") by Samuel Bewsher, an Assistant Master of St Paul's School and secretary to the High Master. It started with 6 pupils at a house in Edith Road, West Kensington. At about this time, St Paul's School was relocated from the vicinity of St Paul's Cathedral to new buildings in Hammersmith.

Colet Court 
In 1883, Bewsher's preparatory school was incorporated into the St Paul's School foundation, and moved into a new building (which still stands) at 100 Hammersmith Road. Originally called Colet House, it was opposite the then St Paul's School. It had more than 300 pupils, and further new buildings to accommodate them were completed in 1890. In 1892 it changed its name from Colet House to Colet Court. The name honours John Colet, the founder of St Paul's School.

In the 1970s, the old buildings became the production base of the Euston Films subsidiary of Thames Television, with standing sets for shows like The Sweeney constructed in the old gymnasium.

The main building survives, and is Grade II listed. It is now occupied as offices.

Barnes 
In 1968 St Paul's School moved to its present  site in bend of the river Thames at Barnes. The current school buildings in Barnes are set to be redeveloped alongside the renovation of the main St Paul's School. In September 2016 the name changed once more, to St Paul's Juniors.

Operation Winthorpe
Colet Court was investigated by the Metropolitan Police for historic crimes of paedophilia, under the operational name Operation Winthorpe. The school has entirely reviewed and majorly revised its safeguarding procedures since.
A major independent report published in January 2020 revealed 80 complaints against 32 members of staff over a period of six decades, mainly from the 1960s to the 1990s. There were 28 recommendations on how current practice could be improved.

The present school
St Paul's Juniors now forms part of a single school campus on the Barnes site. St Paul's Juniors and St Paul's School, whilst housed separately, share many facilities, such as the lunch hall, sports centre, swimming pool and some sports fields.

St Paul's Juniors is an all-boys school and teaches pupils from age 7 to age 13. Entry is by examination at age 7, age 8 and age 11. Providing that a pupil is progressing normally academically, it is expected that all boys will go on to St Paul's at age 13. There are currently about 445 pupils, who are all day boys. The current head is Oliver Snowball, formerly the headmaster of Eaton House the Manor Girls' School.
                                              
The Tatler Schools Guide says of St Paul's Juniors: "These may well be the cleverest boys in the capital, on track for St Paul’s (20 SPS scholarships last year, as well as two to Westminster and one apiece to Eton and Marlborough), but they wear it lightly."

Joseph

Joseph and the Amazing Technicolor Dreamcoat, by Andrew Lloyd Webber and Tim Rice, was originally commissioned for and performed by the boys (both orchestra and singers) of Colet Court.  The first performance in its original form as a 15-minute "pop cantata" took place in the Old Assembly Hall of Colet Court in Hammersmith on 1 March 1968.  The second performance, also involving Colet Court boys, was on 12 May 1968 at Central Hall, Westminster.  This was picked up by a reviewer for the Sunday Times.  The third performance, of a  now expanded version, was at St Paul's Cathedral on 9 November 1968.  The first recording was released in 1969, and remained in the US charts for three months, since when the piece has been performed commercially all over the world and re-recorded on disc and on video.  It has been performed again at Colet Court as the annual school play several times, most recently in 2004.

Headmasters

Notable alumni
 Philip "Tubby" Clayton
 David W. Doyle
 Dominic Grieve
Kwasi Kwarteng
 Compton Mackenzie
 George Osborne
 Nicholas Parsons
 Eddie Redmayne
 Nathaniel Philip Rothschild
 Ernest Shepard
 Lister Sinclair
 William Temple
 Ed Vaizey
 Brian Widlake
 Francis Wright

See also
 St Paul's School, London

References

External links
 
  The Story of Joseph and the Amazing Technicolor Dreamcoat
 

Barnes, London
Educational institutions established in 1881
Private boys' schools in London
Private schools in the London Borough of Richmond upon Thames
Preparatory schools in London
1881 establishments in England